The Young Egypt Party is an Egyptian political party.

History and profile
The party was established on 12 October 1989. It was legalized in 1990.

The Party platform calls for:
 Establishing a parliamentary/presidential ruling system.
 Enhancing the Egyptian-Arab ties.
 Achieving integration with African countries.
 Adopting non-alignment policies.
 Establishing the socialist Islamic economic system and boosting the role of the private sector.

The Party fielded seven candidates to run for the 2000 legislative elections.

References

External links
Misr El-Fatah (Young Egypt) New Party
Facebook page

1989 establishments in Egypt
Arab nationalism in Egypt
Arab socialist political parties
Islamic political parties in Egypt
Islamic socialist political parties
Nationalist parties in Egypt
Pan-Arabist political parties
Political parties established in 1989
Socialist parties in Egypt